Anderson Ferrell is an American novelist. He was the winner of a 1996 Whiting Award for his novel Home for a Day.

He is originally from Wilson County, North Carolina.

Works
 
 Home for the Day Knopf, 1994

Reviews
...Ferrell's mismanaged plot device fails to spoil his novel. His melodious backtracking and sweet-tea atmospherics, along with his catty eye for small-town social distinctions and his keen ear for fence-line gossip, imbue much of Have You Heard with a juicy charm. Like the world at large, though, it would be far better off without gay-baiting politicians and town-square gunfire.

References

Awards
Profile at The Whiting Foundation

20th-century American novelists
21st-century American novelists
American male novelists
Living people
American LGBT novelists
American gay writers
People from Wilson County, North Carolina
Novelists from North Carolina
20th-century American male writers
21st-century American male writers
Year of birth missing (living people)
21st-century LGBT people